Farrakhan is the surname of the following people:
Khadijah Farrakhan, African-American Muslim, wife of Louis 
Louis Farrakhan (born Louis Eugene Wolcott in 1933), American religious leader, activist, and social commentator
Mustapha Farrakhan, Jr. (born 1988), American basketball player

See also
Farrukhi (name)
Farah (name)
Farhan (name)
Khan (surname)